From 1960 to 1987, the professional American football team now known as the Arizona Cardinals played in St. Louis, Missouri, as the St. Louis Cardinals.

The team moved from Chicago to St. Louis in 1960, and played their first home game there on October 2 at Busch Stadium against the New York Giants. Their last home game in St. Louis, played at Busch Memorial Stadium on December 13, 1987, was also against the Giants. Their last game as a St. Louis-based club was on December 27, 1987, at the Dallas Cowboys.

During the Cardinals' 28 years in St. Louis, they advanced to the playoffs just four times (1964, 1974, 1975, and 1982), and never hosted a playoff game. Their only postseason win came in the 1964 Playoff Bowl.

Their winning percentage of  during their time in St. Louis—187 victories, 202 losses, and 13 ties—is better than those in the other two cities the Cardinals have called home.

The team moved to Tempe, Arizona, in 1988.

1960–1973: St. Louis gets a team
In 1947, the Chicago Cardinals football team was owned by Violet Bidwill, who inherited it from her late husband Charles Bidwill. Two years later, she married St. Louis businessman Walter Wolfner. By the late 1950s, it had become obvious that the Cardinals could no longer hope to compete with the Chicago Bears, and a move to St. Louis seemed to make sense. Moreover, with competition from the nascent American Football League looming, NFL owners sought to preserve their market domination by expanding their established league to more cities. The NFL examined St. Louis, and concluded that it could support a team.

1960s
On March 13, 1960, the league's 12 owners unanimously approved the Cardinals' move to St. Louis, ending the team's 62-year history and 40 NFL seasons in Chicago. In addition to the NFL's blessing, the Bidwills sought permission from the long-established baseball team in their new city to share the "Cardinals" nickname. Other cities had hosted football teams that copied the local baseball team's name, but the Cardinals were (and remain) the only American team with a long-established nickname that moved to a city where another major sports franchise coincidentally had the same long-established name. 

During the Cardinals' tenure in St. Louis, they were locally called the "Big Red", the "Football Cardinals", or "the Gridbirds" in order to avoid confusion with the baseball team. 

The Cardinals played in the original Busch Stadium as tenants of the baseball team. St. Louis had not had a professional football team since the early days of the NFL. For decades, the NFL had had demanded a modern stadium as a condition for returning to the city, until the prospect of competition with the AFL compelled them to approve the Cardinals' move in exchange for a pledge to eventually build a new venue. However, it was clear the team would be playing for at least a few years not only in an antiquated ballpark not designed for football with poor and outdated infrastructure and in a neighborhood that had fallen into disrepair. Moreover, the baseball team had priority for scheduling. Under these circumstances, tickets proved difficult to sell. The Cardinals initially held practices in the city park. In 1961, they finished .500 at 7–7 after the NFL had expanded to a 14-game season to compete with the upstart AFL, but and fell to 4–9–1 in 1962. Improving to 9–5–0 in 1963, the Cardinals almost reached the playoffs, but a loss to the Giants prevented that.

The Cardinals were competitive for much of the 1960s. New stars emerged in Larry Wilson, Charley Johnson, Jim Bakken, Sonny Randle, and Jim Hart. Violet Bidwill Wolfner died in 1962, and her sons, Bill and Charles, Jr. took control. Although the Cardinals were competitive in the '60s, they failed to achieve a playoff appearance during the decade.

In 1964, the Cardinals got off to a good start, going undefeated in their first four games (all on the road), their only blemish being a 33-33 tie against the Cleveland Browns. However, the Cardinals were then forced to play what was supposed to be their home opener against the Baltimore Colts at Memorial Stadium when their landlords reached the World Series. They lost to the Colts 47-27 in Baltimore. The defeat in the extra road game proved painfully decisive as while St. Louis finished 9–4–1 and second in the Eastern Conference (enough to qualify for a postseason game) a victory by the Browns over the New York Giants denied them a championship berth by a mere half game. The team finished the year with a Playoff Bowl win over the Packers.

By 1964, the Bidwills were disappointed with the progress of the new downtown stadium and considered moving the team to Atlanta. St. Louis city leaders provided some incentives, which combined with groundbreaking at a new stadium later that year persuaded them to stay. While the football team would continue to be tenants in the new facility, they received better lease terms, furthermore the new venue was a "cookie-cutter" multipurpose stadium, considered state-of-the-art at the time and designed from the outset to readily accommodate both baseball and football. The new stadium would eventually be completed in 1966 and be named Busch Memorial Stadium after the owner of the baseball team. A new expansion team, the Falcons of the NFL, was eventually created for Atlanta and began play in 1966, while a different St. Louis team would move to Atlanta: the NBA Hawks in 1968.

A 4–1–0 start to the 1965 season evaporated into a 5–9–0 finish. Starting quarterback Charley Johnson struggled most of the season with a shoulder injury and defensive leader Larry Wilson missed games with broken hands. 

In 1966 (the team's first in the newly opened Busch Memorial Stadium), the Cardinals had a new head coach in Charley Winner. They were in first place in the Eastern Conference with a 7-1–1 record, but Johnson suffered a season-ending injury against the Giants and the Cardinals lost four of their last five games leaving them out of the playoffs. The 1966 season saw the debut of first-round draft pick Johnny Roland who gained 908 yards from scrimmage and was named NFL Rookie of the Year.

In 1967, Johnson was summoned to active duty in the Army. This opened the door for Jim Hart who was signed as an undrafted free agent out of Southern Illinois University the previous season. Hart threw for over 3000 yards and 19 touchdowns in 1967, but the team finished with six wins, seven losses, and one tie.

In 1968, the Cardinals swept the Cleveland Browns and ended the year with a 9–4–1 mark, but a loss to San Francisco 49ers and a tie against the woeful Pittsburgh Steelers kept the Cardinals out of the playoffs.

St. Louis fell back to 4–9–1 in 1969, but that season saw the debut of Roger Wehrli, a star safety at the University of Missouri who played 14 seasons for the Cardinals and was elected to the Pro Football Hall of Fame in 2007.

Early 1970s
In 1970, the NFL and AFL completed their merger, and the Cardinals were placed in the new NFC East division. They posted three consecutive shutouts in November, blanking the Oilers, Patriots, and the Cowboys, the latter a 38–0 victory on Monday Night Football in the Cotton Bowl. But St. Louis collapsed down the stretch, losing December games to the New York Giants, Detroit Lions, and Washington to finish 8–5–1 and out of the playoffs. The Cardinals then regressed to three consecutive 4–9–1 seasons from 1971 to 1973. Bill Bidwill became sole owner in 1972; he would own the team until his death in 2019. Only the New York Giants and Chicago Bears have been in the hands of one family longer than the Cardinals.

Head Coach Bob Hollway was fired after consecutive 4-9-1 seasons in 1971 and 1972. 1972 season; he was replaced the following year by Don Coryell, who had built a powerhouse program at San Diego State.

1974–1977
The Cardinals raced out a 7–0 record to open the 1974 season and won the NFC East championship — their first division or conference title since their unsuccessful title defense of 1948 — by a season sweep of the Redskins. However, the team did not receive home-field advantage; under the NFL playoff format of the day, the venue of first-round games simply rotated among division champions and in 1974 it was the NFC East champion's turn to go on the road. A victory in the first round would have brought the NFC Championship Game to St. Louis, but this was not to be. While the Cardinals took an early 7–0 lead against the Minnesota Vikings in Bloomington, Minnesota, a missed field goal just before halftime sapped their momentum. The Vikings scored 16 points in the first seven minutes of the second half and cruised to a 30–14 victory.

The Cardinals repeated as NFC East champions in 1975, but were once again denied home-field advantage in the first round. The playoff format had been changed before the season to ensure that the two division champions with the best records in each conference earned home-field advantage in the divisional round – as it happened, the Cardinals were the lowest-seeded NFC division champion. The playoff game against the Los Angeles Rams was a disaster: Lawrence McCutcheon set an NFL playoff record by rushing for 202 yards, and Jack Youngblood and Bill Simpson returned interceptions for touchdowns, staking the Rams to a 28–9 halftime lead en route to a 35–23 victory at the Los Angeles Memorial Coliseum. The defeat ultimately cost the Cardinals yet another chance to host the NFC Championship Game, as their division rival Cowboys ended up beating the NFC Central champion Vikings the next day in Bloomington.

During this period, the Cardinals boasted an effective offense in the wake of a record-setting offensive line which included standouts Dan Dierdorf, Conrad Dobler, and Tom Banks.

This period for the franchise was characterized by exciting close games, come-from-behind nailbiters, and several frustrating near-misses. The press and league fans began to call the team the "Cardiac Cardinals". Team stars from the 1970s included Wehrli, wide receiver Mel Gray, and running backs Terry Metcalf and Jim Otis.

On Thanksgiving 1976, the Cardinals suffered a controversial loss to the Dallas Cowboys. Cardinals tight end J. V. Cain, running an apparent game-winning route, was shoved out of the end zone by Dallas defensive backs Cliff Harris and Charlie Waters in what appeared to be obvious interference, but a penalty was not called. With this loss, the Cardinals were dethroned from the divisional lead and became the first NFC team to reach 10 wins without qualifying for the playoffs. Ultimately, the Cardinals would become the only 10-win NFC team to miss the playoffs under a 14-game schedule. It was the Redskins' sweep of the season series that kept them out of the playoffs.

In 1977, the Cardinals started slowly but won 6 consecutive games before losing the Thanksgiving Day game to the Miami Dolphins, 55–14. Bob Griese's record-setting day turned out to be the first of 12 straight losses for the Cardinals (extending into 1978), a streak which included being only the second team ever to lose to the previously winless Tampa Bay Buccaneers, and the first to lose in Tampa Stadium. Coryell and several key players, including Dobler and Metcalf, departed the team at the end of the 1977 season.

1978–1985: Decline
For the 1978 season, Bidwill hired Bud Wilkinson, famous for building a football dynasty in 17 seasons at the University of Oklahoma. But Wilkinson, who had been out of coaching since retiring from the Sooners following the 1963 season, could not turn the Cardinals around. St. Louis started 1978 with eight straight losses and finished at 6–10, and Wilkinson was fired in 1979 with the Cardinals at 3–10 and last in the NFC East. Wilkinson was canned by Bidwill for refusing to bench quarterback Jim Hart in favor of rookie Steve Pisarkiewicz. Larry Wilson, the Pro Football Hall of Fame safety who starred for the Cardinals for 13 seasons, coached the final three games of the 1979 season, finishing with a 5–11 record.

The Cardinals experienced several years of notoriously poor drafts and unfortunate personnel moves in the late 1970s, typified by the first-round selection of kicker Steve Little, who was paralyzed in a 1980 automobile accident, and hiring Wilkinson in 1978. The team also suffered a tragic loss during the 1979 training camp when Cain died of a heart attack.

However, the Cardinals had some success in the early 1980s, posting three consecutive winning seasons from 1982 to 1984. The heart of this squad was the prolific trio of quarterback Neil Lomax, wide receiver Roy Green, and running back Ottis Anderson. Stellar performances by Anderson could not salvage the Cardinals' 1980 and 1981 campaigns, which ended at 5–11 and 7–9, respectively.

In 1982, the Cardinals qualified for the expanded 16-team playoff field with a 5–4 mark in the strike-shortened year, but fell 41–16 to the Green Bay Packers.

St. Louis finished 1983 at 8–7–1, including victories over the eventual Super Bowl champion Los Angeles Raiders and the Seattle Seahawks, who lost to the Raiders in the AFC championship game; the team also lost in meetings between the two NFC Championship game participants, the NFC champion Washington Redskins and their opponent, the San Francisco 49ers.

The Cardinals entered the final weekend of 1984 with a chance to win the NFC East by defeating the Redskins, but Neil O'Donoghue missed a game-winning field goal at the gun, giving Washington a 29–27 victory and the division championship; the team finished 9–7 and missed the playoffs.

St. Louis started 1985 3–1, but finished 5–11, leading to the termination of coach Jim Hanifan after six seasons. Hanifan would return triumphantly to St. Louis 14 years later, serving as offensive line coach during the St. Louis Rams' Super Bowl championship season in 1999.

1986–1987: Final seasons in St. Louis

Gene Stallings, formerly the head coach at Texas A&M and a long-time assistant to Tom Landry with the Cowboys, replaced Hanifan. The Cardinals finished 4–11–1 in 1986, but improved to 7–8 in 1987, falling just one win shy of the playoffs, losing 21–16 on the final Sunday of the season to the Cowboys.

The 1987 season is remembered for a stunning comeback, rallying from a 28–3 deficit against the Buccaneers by scoring 28 points in the fourth quarter for a 31–28 victory. It remains the largest fourth-quarter comeback in NFL history.

The overall mediocrity of the Cardinals, combined with an old stadium, caused game attendance to dwindle, and once again the Bidwills decided to move the team, this time to either Baltimore, Phoenix, or Jacksonville. Nonetheless, Cardinals fans were unhappy at losing their team, and Bill Bidwill, fearing for his safety, stayed away from several of the 1987 home games. Their last home game was on December 13, 1987, in which the Cardinals won 27–24 over the New York Giants in front of 29,623 fans on a late Sunday afternoon.

On March 15, 1988, the NFL team owners voted to allow Bidwill to move the Cardinals from St. Louis to Tempe, Arizona, for the 1988 NFL season. Both Jacksonville and Baltimore later got NFL teams of their own (in Baltimore's case, it was a return of the NFL) when the Jaguars began play in 1995, and the Ravens controversially started in 1996 respectively.

The NFL returns to St. Louis, and then leaves again
The NFL returned to St. Louis in 1995, when the Los Angeles Rams moved there. The Rams would go on to win Super Bowl XXXIV in 2000 against the Tennessee Titans, becoming the first NFL team to win a championship in three different cities (previously in Cleveland, Ohio, in 1945 and Los Angeles, California, in 1951). Due to the NFL's scheduling rotation, the Arizona Cardinals only played one game in St. Louis prior to 2002, a 20-17 win over the Rams at Trans World Dome.

The Cardinals and Rams became divisional rivals in 2002 when the NFL changed from six divisions to eight; this ensured that the Cardinals, now in the NFC West, played one regular season game in St. Louis annually until the 2015 season, after which the Rams moved back to Los Angeles. During this time, the Cardinals would finally appear in their first Super Bowl, in which they lost to the Pittsburgh Steelers.

With the Rams' move back to Los Angeles, St. Louis became the first city to have lost two NFL teams to the western United States. The Rams would go on to win their second championship in Los Angeles at Super Bowl LVI in 2022, defeating the Cincinnati Bengals.

Season records

Notable players

Pro Football Hall of Famers

Italics = played a portion of career with the Cardinals and enshrined representing another team.
Dierdorf, Smith, Wehrli and Wilson were members of the St. Louis Football Ring of Fame in The Dome at America's Center when the Rams played there from 1995 to 2015.

Retired numbers

Notes:
 1 Posthumously retired.

See also
 History of the St. Louis Rams

References

External links 

 St. Louis Cardinals Extra Pointer Newsletter Finding Aid at the St. Louis Public Library

St. Louis
St. Louis Cardinals (football)